Michael Arndt is an American screenwriter. He is best known as the writer of the films Little Miss Sunshine (2006), Toy Story 3 (2010), and Star Wars: The Force Awakens (2015).

Arndt won the Academy Award for Best Original Screenplay for Little Miss Sunshine and was nominated for Best Adapted Screenplay for Toy Story 3. This made Arndt the first screenwriter ever to be nominated for both the Academy Award for Best Original Screenplay and Best Adapted Screenplay for his first two screenplays.

He has also been credited under the pseudonyms Michael deBruyn and Rick Kerb, which are mainly used for script revisions.

Early life
Arndt was born in McLean, Virginia. Arndt's father was a member of the Foreign Service, and as a result he lived in various countries, including Sri Lanka and India; he also lived in Virginia for a time. Arndt graduated from Langley High School in McLean, and also attended The Potomac School. He graduated from the Tisch School of the Arts at New York University. Arndt was a script reader for some time, and was a personal assistant to actor Matthew Broderick until late 1999, when he chose to begin writing screenplays full-time.

Screenwriting career

Arndt wrote the first draft of Little Miss Sunshine in three days between May 23–26, 2000. From that initial draft, he made approximately 100 revisions over the course of a year, requesting input from friends and family.  Arndt considered directing the film himself "as a no-budget, DV feature" due to his concern of the story being "just too small and "indie" to get any real attention from Hollywood".  After the Endeavor Talent Agency read the script in July 2001, however, producers Albert Berger and Ron Yerxa subsequently gave the script to commercial and music video directors Jonathan Dayton and Valerie Faris, who were immediately attracted to the project.  Dayton and Faris were signed on by producer Marc Turtletaub, who purchased the script from Arndt for $250,000, on December 21, 2001.

The project was set up at Focus Features, where it was in various stages of pre-production for approximately three years. During that time, Arndt was fired when he objected to centralizing the story on Richard Hoover (played by Greg Kinnear in the film), only to be re-hired within a month after the new writer hired by Focus left the project.  Arndt resumed work on the script, which continued through production and into post-production: "The final scene of the movie [...] was written and shot about eight weeks before [its premiere at the Sundance Film Festival on January 20, 2006]", he said.  Following its theatrical release on August 18, 2006, Little Miss Sunshine won many prizes and awards.  Arndt won multiple Best Original Screenplay awards for Little Miss Sunshine, from the Academy of Motion Picture Arts and Sciences, the British Academy of Film and Television Arts, and the Writers Guild of America. He was later invited to join the Academy of Motion Picture Arts and Sciences.

Arndt began collaborating with Lee Unkrich and other Pixar personnel on the screenplay for Toy Story 3 in 2006, working from a treatment by Andrew Stanton, who co-wrote the two preceding films in the series. He was nominated for Best Adapted Screenplay for his work for Toy Story 3, and became the first ever screenwriter to be nominated for both Academy Awards for Best Original Screenplay and Best Adapted Screenplay for his first two screenplays.

Arndt was one of several screenwriters brought on to perform script revisions for Men in Black 3.

Arndt wrote the script for The Hunger Games sequel, The Hunger Games: Catching Fire, based on the best-selling novel of the same name by Suzanne Collins.

In November 2012, Arndt was announced as the screenwriter for Star Wars: The Force Awakens. In October 2013, it was announced that Lawrence Kasdan and director J. J. Abrams were rewriting Arndt's script.

Filmography

Assistant
 Addicted to Love (1997)
 Inspector Gadget (1999)

Senior creative team
 WALL-E (2008)
 Up (2009) (Uncredited)
 Toy Story 3 (2010)
 Cars 2 (2011)

References

Further reading

External links
 
 Interview with Michael Arndt about writing Little Miss Sunshine

American male screenwriters
Best Original Screenplay Academy Award winners
Best Original Screenplay BAFTA Award winners 
Independent Spirit Award winners
Tisch School of the Arts alumni
Living people
People from McLean, Virginia
Disney people
Pixar people
Screenwriters from Virginia
Writers Guild of America Award winners
Year of birth missing (living people)